Sartorina is a genus of flowering plants in the tribe Eupatorieae within the family Asteraceae.

Species
The only known species is Sartorina schultzii. The native range of the species is unknown. It was described from an old specimen at the Schultz-Bonpontius Museum in Paris, labeled only as having been collected in "tropical America."

References

Monotypic Asteraceae genera
Eupatorieae